Aase Ingerid Nathalie Bjerkholt (16 January 1915 – 17 August 2012) was a Norwegian politician for the Labour Party. She was born in Oslo.

She was consultative councillor of state for family and consumer affairs during the third cabinet Gerhardsen in 1955–1956, and became the first Minister of Family and Consumer Affairs in 1956. She held the post until 1965, except for one month in 1963 during the cabinet Lyng. From January to February 1963 she was also caretaking Minister of Social Affairs.

She was elected to the Norwegian Parliament from Oslo in 1958, and was re-elected on three occasions. On the local level she was a member of Oslo city council from 1945 to 1947.

References

1915 births
2012 deaths
Ministers of Children, Equality and Social Inclusion of Norway
Members of the Storting
Labour Party (Norway) politicians
Politicians from Oslo
Women members of the Storting
Women government ministers of Norway